Heimo Kump (born April 1, 1968) is an Austrian football manager and former player. He previously managed clubs including DSV Leoben.

References

1968 births
Living people
Austrian footballers
Austrian football managers
DSV Leoben managers

Association footballers not categorized by position